Fausto Guerzoni (1904–1967) was an Italian film actor. A character actor, he appeared in Italian films in supporting roles from the mid-1930s.

Selected filmography
 Cavalry (1936)
 The Former Mattia Pascal (1937)
 Star of the Sea (1938)
 All of Life in One Night (1938)
 Under the Southern Cross (1938)
 Diamonds (1939)
 A Thousand Lire a Month (1939)
 Backstage (1939)
 The Thrill of the Skies (1940)
 Lucky Night (1941)
 The King's Jester (1941)
 Idyll in Budapest (1941)
 A Husband for the Month of April (1941)
 A Garibaldian in the Convent (1942)
 Short Circuit (1943)
 L'abito nero da sposa (1945)
 Unknown Man of San Marino (1946)
 The Great Dawn (1947)
 Bicycle Thieves (1948)
 Eleven Men and a Ball (1948)
 Altura (1949)
 Tragic Spell (1951)
 His Last Twelve Hours (1951)
 Mamma Mia, What an Impression! (1951)
 Frontier Wolf (1952)
 Rome 11:00 (1952)
 Anna of Brooklyn (1958)
 Black Orpheus (1959)

References

Bibliography
 Bianca Freire-Medeiros. Touring Poverty. Routledge, 2014.

External links

1904 births
1967 deaths
Italian male film actors
People from the Province of Modena